Annelie Lotriet (born 8 June 1960) is a South African politician, a Member of Parliament with the Democratic Alliance (DA) who is the Shadow Minister of Science and Technology and served as Acting Leader of the Opposition. She is also the provincial chairperson of the DA in the Free State. In May 2019, Lotriet was elected Democratic Alliance Caucus Chairperson.

Background 
Lotriet was born in Johannesburg, South Africa and matriculated at the Hoërskool Linden. She is married to Pieter and they have four sons. She continued her studies at the Rand Afrikaans University where she obtained a BA Languages majoring in English and Latin. She went on to a D.Ed with specialization in Higher Education.

Lotriet then lectured in the Department of Education at Vista University in Bloemfontein from 1985 to 1994 before her appointment as senior lecturer at the University of the Free State, initially at the Unit for Language Facilitation and Empowerment, and later in the Department of Afroasiatic Studies, Sign Language and Language Practice. She progressed to associate professor in the department before her appointment as head of the department. She worked on the training and management of the interpreting service at the Truth and Reconciliation Commission and the training of interpreters for all levels of government.

Parliamentarian 

Between 1985 and 2000 Lotriet served on the OFM Board of Directors. She entered local politics in 2000 serving as a DA ward councillor in Mangaung for six years. Her current constituency is the Eastern Free State. Lotriet has further applied her dedicated service to many provincial and national committees, boards and associations, and was a member of the Pan South African Language Board.

Lotriet currently serves the Democratic Alliance as Shadow Minister of Science and Technology. She was earlier the Shadow Minister of Higher Education and Training and Shadow Minister of Arts and Culture. She was also President of Free State Aquatics.

References 

1960 births
Living people
Democratic Alliance (South Africa) politicians
Members of the National Council of Provinces
Women members of the National Council of Provinces
University of Johannesburg alumni
Academic staff of Vista University
Academic staff of the University of the Free State
Members of the National Assembly of South Africa
21st-century South African politicians
People from Johannesburg
Politicians from Gauteng
People from Gauteng
People from the Free State (province)
Politicians from the Free State (province)
21st-century South African women politicians
Women opposition leaders